The 7th Kazakhstan President Cup was played from June 25 to June 29, 2014 in Astana. 6 youth teams participated in the tournament (players were born no earlier than 1998.)

Participants

Venues 
All games took place in  «Astana Arena».

Format 
The tournament is held in two stages. At the first stage, six teams are divided into two qualification groups (A and B). Competitions of the first stage were held on circular system. The winners of the groups advance to the final, while the group runners-up meet to determine third place.

Group stage
All times UTC+6

Group A

Group B

Match for the 5th place

Bronze medal match

Final

Statistics

Goalscorers 

5 goals

  Giorgi Arabidze

4 goals

  Daniel Villanueva

3 goals

  Kara Karaevi
  Carles Perez

2 goals

  Lasha Leshava
  Irakli Bugridze
  Gabriel Sagrishvili
  Francisco Vilalba
  Antonio Segura

1 goal

  Ali Aliyev
  Oruj Ismayilov
  Hajiaga Hajiyev
  Emin Safihanov
  David Koburi
  Adilzhan Zhaksybay
  Altynbek Tuleyev
  Aksultan Asainov
  Alibek Kasym
  Aleña Carles
  Daniel Olmo
  Oriol Busquets
  Hudodjod Uzokov
  Muhamadjon Sharipov
  Karomatullo Saidov

Awards 
The best player of a tournament
 Aleña Carles
Goalscorer of a tournament
 Giorgi Arabidze (5 goals)
The best goalkeeper of a tournament
 Behruz Hayriyev
The best defender of a tournament
 Nikolozi Kurshavishvili 
The best midfielder of a tournament
 Francesco Vilalba
The best forward of a tournament
 Giorgi Arabidze and  Daniel Villanueva

Prize money 
According to FFK, the prize fund of a tournament will make 20,000 $. "The teams which took 1, 2 and 3 place will be received, respectively 10,000, 6,000 and 4,000 $.

References 

2014
2014 in Kazakhstani football
2014 in youth association football